Jimmy Drake (March 24, 1912 – July 24, 1968), known professionally as Nervous Norvus, was an American musician known for the controversial novelty song "Transfusion".

Early life
He was born in Memphis, Tennessee, and lived for a few years in Ripley, Tennessee. Because of his chronic asthma condition, his family moved to California when he was seven, eventually settling in East Hollywood, Los Angeles.

Career
When he was 29, he moved to Oakland, California, where he lived for the rest of his life. He was a truck driver for a time, and in 1953, looking for a way to get off the roads, he began to get his feet wet in the recording industry. He bought a reel-to-reel tape recorder, a cheap second-hand piano, and a baritone ukulele. With these accessories, he started supplementing his truck driving income in earnest by recording demos of his fellow amateur songwriter's offerings.

His novelty song "Transfusion", recorded for the Dot Records label, was a top-ten hit in May 1956, reaching number 8 on the Billboard Best Sellers chart.  A second single, "Ape Call", released in July of that year, also charted and peaked at #28. A third Dot single, "The Fang", released in September 1956, did not chart at all.

The lyrics in "Transfusion" concern a reckless driver who repeatedly gets seriously injured in car accidents by disregarding traffic laws (speeding, unsafe lane changes, and disregarding stop signs); he vows to never speed again after each accident, but quickly goes back to his dangerous driving habits after asking for (and receiving) a blood transfusion each time. This novelty song features the sound effects of a vehicle collision. The song was banned on many radio stations in the 1950s. The song was later played on the radio by Barry Hansen, which reportedly led to Hansen's nickname Dr. Demento.

Death
Drake died at age 56 in Alameda County, California of cirrhosis of the liver. His body was donated to the University of California, San Francisco, Anatomy Department.

References

External links

1912 births
1968 deaths
American comedy musicians
Outsider musicians
Dot Records artists
Deaths from cirrhosis
20th-century American singers
People from Memphis, Tennessee
People from Ripley, Tennessee
People from Los Angeles
People from Oakland, California
Comedians from California
20th-century American comedians
20th-century American male singers